Podopterus is a genus of plants in the family Polygonaceae with three species in Mexico and Central America.

References

Polygonaceae genera